Dyachenkovo is a rural locality (a selo) and the administrative center of Dyachenkovskoye Rural Settlement, Bogucharsky District, Voronezh Oblast, Russia. The population was 2,288 as of 2010. There are 22 streets.

Geography 
Dyachenkovo is located 8 km southeast of Boguchar (the district's administrative centre) by road. Kupyanka is the nearest rural locality.

References 

Rural localities in Bogucharsky District